The year 1996 involved many significant films. The major releases this year included Scream, Independence Day, Fargo, Trainspotting, The Rock, The English Patient, Twister, Space Jam, Mars Attacks!, Jerry Maguire and a film version of the musical Evita.

Highest-grossing films

The top 10 films released in 1996 by worldwide gross are as follows:

Box office records
 Independence Day became the highest-grossing film of Will Smith's career, up until it was surpassed by Aladdin (2019).
 Rumble in the Bronx was released in North America, becoming Jackie Chan's first major box office hit in the region. It became the year's most profitable film, with its US box office alone earning over 20 times its budget. It was Chan's biggest ever hit up until then.

Context 
The theatrical year of 1996 achieved a $5.8 billion domestic gross milestone and saw a record twelve films earning over $100 million by the end of December, with Independence Day earning over $300 million. However, the film industry experienced a surplus of releases between 1995 and 1996 that resulted in several box office flops, studio bankruptcies and sales, and otherwise successful films struggling to turn in a profit. The average cost of producing and marketing film rose to $60 million, a 20% increase from the previous year, with a contributing factor being the record high-salaries for stars such as Sylvester Stallone, Tom Cruise, Arnold Schwarzenegger, Mel Gibson, Jim Carrey, Harrison Ford, Michael Douglas, Sharon Stone, Julia Roberts, and Demi Moore that became the subject of industry scrutiny following several high profile flops that were released in between 1995 and 1996. This resulted in studios having to cut their film slate by fifty percent to offset growing production and marketing costs and ensure more profits.

Events
 July 10 – Nickelodeon releases its first feature film, Harriet the Spy, a spy-comedy-drama film based on the 1964 novel of the same name. It also launches the career of then-child actress Michelle Trachtenberg.
 Mid-July – Production begins on Titanic.
 September 20 – 75-year-old English actor Sir Dirk Bogarde has a severe stroke. He continued to need a wheelchair until his death in 1999.

Award ceremonies
 1st Empire Awards

Awards

1996 wide-released movies

January–March

April–June

July–September

October–December

Notable films released in 1996
United States unless stated

#
 101 Dalmatians, directed by Stephen Herek, starring Glenn Close, Jeff Daniels, Joely Richardson, Joan Plowright, Hugh Laurie
 2 Days in the Valley, starring Jeff Daniels, James Spader, Eric Stoltz, Teri Hatcher, Marsha Mason, Charlize Theron

A
 The Adventures of Pinocchio, directed by Steve Barron, starring Jonathan Taylor Thomas, Martin Landau, Udo Kier, Rob Schneider, Dawn French – (UK/US)
 Alaska, starring Thora Birch, Vincent Kartheiser, Dirk Benedict, Charlton Heston
 All Dogs Go to Heaven 2, voices of Charlie Sheen, Dom DeLuise, Ernest Borgnine, Charles Nelson Reilly, Sheena Easton
 American Buffalo, starring Dustin Hoffman, Dennis Franz, Sean Nelson
 Andersonville, directed by John Frankenheimer, starring Jarrod Emick and Frederic Forrest
 Another Mother (De Nieuwe Moeder) – (Netherlands/Estonia)
 The Apartment, starring Vincent Cassel and Monica Bellucci – (France)
 The Arrival, starring Charlie Sheen – (United States/Mexico)
 The Associate, starring Whoopi Goldberg, Dianne Wiest, Tim Daly
 August, starring Anthony Hopkins – (UK/US)
 Avvai Shanmughi – (India)

B
 Bad Moon, starring Mariel Hemingway and Michael Paré
 The Bandit (Eskiya) – (Turkey)
 Barb Wire, starring Pamela Anderson
 Basquiat, starring Jeffrey Wright and David Bowie
 Bastard Out of Carolina, directed by Anjelica Huston, starring Jennifer Jason Leigh
 Beautiful Girls, starring Matt Dillon, Timothy Hutton, Natalie Portman, Uma Thurman, Rosie O'Donnell, Mira Sorvino
 Beautiful Thing – (U.K.)
 Beavis and Butt-Head Do America, directed by Mike Judge, voices by Bruce Willis, Demi Moore, Cloris Leachman, Robert Stack, David Letterman
 Bed of Roses, starring Christian Slater and Mary Stuart Masterson
 Before and After, starring Meryl Streep, Liam Neeson, Edward Furlong
 Besos en la Frente (Kisses on the Forehead) – (Argentina)
 Beyond Hypothermia (Sip si 32 dou) – (Hong Kong)
 Beyond Silence (Jenseits der Stille) – (Germany)
 Big Bullet (Chong feng dui nu huo jie tou) – (Hong Kong)
 Big Bully, starring Tom Arnold and Rick Moranis
 Big Night, starring Stanley Tucci, Tony Shalhoub, Ian Holm, Isabella Rossellini, Minnie Driver, Marc Anthony
 The Birdcage, directed by Mike Nichols, starring Robin Williams, Nathan Lane, Gene Hackman, Dianne Wiest
 Black Sheep, starring Chris Farley and David Spade
 Blind Date, directed by Theo van Gogh – (Netherlands)
 Blood and Wine, directed by Bob Rafelson, starring Jack Nicholson, Judy Davis, Michael Caine, Stephen Dorff, Jennifer Lopez
 Blood Brothers, featuring Bruce Springsteen and The E Street Band
 Bogus, directed by Norman Jewison, starring Whoopi Goldberg, Gérard Depardieu, Haley Joel Osment, Nancy Travis
 Bottle Rocket, directed by Wes Anderson, starring Owen Wilson and Luke Wilson
 La Bouche de Jean-Pierre (a.k.a. Parental Guidance) – (France)
 Bound, directed by The Wachowskis, starring Gina Gershon and Jennifer Tilly
 Box of Moonlight, starring John Turturro and Sam Rockwell
 The Boy from Mercury, starring Rita Tushingham and Tom Courtenay – (Ireland)
 The Boy Who Stopped Talking (De Jongen Die niet meer Praatte) – (Netherlands)
 Kids in the Hall: Brain Candy – (Canada)
 Brassed Off, starring Pete Postlethwaite, Tara Fitzgerald, Ewan McGregor – (U.K.)
 Breaking the Waves, directed by Lars von Trier, starring Emily Watson and Stellan Skarsgård – (Denmark)
 Brilliant Lies, starring Gia Carides and Anthony LaPaglia – (Australia)
 Broken Arrow, directed by John Woo, starring John Travolta, Christian Slater, Samantha Mathis, Howie Long, Delroy Lindo
 Broken English – (New Zealand)
 Buenos Aires Vice Versa – (Argentina/Netherlands)
 Bullet, starring Mickey Rourke and Tupac Shakur
 Bulletproof, starring Damon Wayans, Adam Sandler, James Caan

C
 The Cable Guy, directed by Ben Stiller, starring Jim Carrey and Matthew Broderick
 Camping Cosmos – (Belgium)
 Carla's Song, directed by Ken Loach, starring Robert Carlyle – (U.K.)
 Carpool, starring Tom Arnold and David Paymer
 Carried Away, starring Dennis Hopper and Amy Irving
 Caught, starring Edward James Olmos and María Conchita Alonso
 Celtic Pride, starring Dan Aykroyd, Daniel Stern and Damon Wayans
 Chain Reaction, starring Keanu Reeves, Morgan Freeman, Rachel Weisz, Fred Ward
 The Chamber, directed by James Foley, starring Chris O'Donnell and Gene Hackman
 A Chef in Love – (Georgia)
 Christmas Every Day
 Chronicle of a Disappearance (Segell Ikhtifa) – (Palestine)
 Citizen Ruth, directed by Alexander Payne, starring Laura Dern
 City Hall, directed by Harold Becker, starring Al Pacino, John Cusack, Bridget Fonda, Danny Aiello, Martin Landau
 Clando (Clandestine) – (Cameroon)
 Color of a Brisk and Leaping Day, starring Henry Gibson
 Comrades: Almost a Love Story (Tian mi mi), starring Maggie Cheung – (Hong Kong), Hong Kong Film Awards and Golden Space Needle award
 Conspirators of Pleasure (Spiklenci slasti) – (Czech Republic)
 Cosmic Voyage, narrated by Morgan Freeman
 Courage Under Fire, directed by Edward Zwick, starring Denzel Washington, Meg Ryan, Matt Damon, Lou Diamond Phillips
 The Craft, starring Robin Tunney, Fairuza Balk, Neve Campbell, Rachel True
 Crash, directed by David Cronenberg, starring James Spader and Holly Hunter – (Canada/U.K.)
 Crocodile (Ag-o) – (South Korea)
 The Crucible, starring Daniel Day-Lewis, Winona Ryder, Joan Allen, Paul Scofield

D
 D3: The Mighty Ducks, starring Emilio Estevez
 The Day a Pig Fell into the Well (Daijiga umule pajinnal) – (South Korea)
 Daylight, starring Sylvester Stallone and Amy Brenneman
 Dear God, starring Greg Kinnear, Laurie Metcalf, Tim Conway
 Deep Crimson (Profundo Carmesí) – (Mexico)
 The Dentist, starring Corbin Bernsen and Molly Hagan
 Devil's Island (Djöflaeyjan) – (Iceland)
 Diabolique, starring Sharon Stone, Isabelle Adjani, Chazz Palminteri, Kathy Bates
 Different for Girls, starring Rupert Graves and Steven Mackintosh – (U.K./France)
 The Disappearance of Finbar, starring Jonathan Rhys Meyers – (Ireland/Sweden/U.K.)
 Doctor Who
 Don't Be a Menace to South Central While Drinking Your Juice in the Hood, starring Marlon Wayans and Shawn Wayans
 Down Periscope, starring Kelsey Grammer, Lauren Holly, Rob Schneider, Rip Torn, Bruce Dern
 Dragonheart, starring Dennis Quaid and Sean Connery – (UK/US)
 The Dress (De jurk) – (Netherlands)
 Drifting Clouds (Kauas pilvet karkaavat), directed by Aki Kaurismäki – (Finland)
 Dunston Checks In, starring Jason Alexander, Faye Dunaway, Rupert Everett, Eric Lloyd, Glenn Shadix
 Dying to Go Home (Mortinho por Chegar a Casa) – (Portugal)

E
 Earth (Tierra) – (Spain)
 East Palace, West Palace (Dong gong xi gong), directed by Zhang Yuan – (China)
 Eddie, directed by Steve Rash, starring Whoopi Goldberg, Frank Langella, Dennis Farina
 Edipo Alcalde (Oedipus Mayor) – (Colombia)
 The Eighth Day (Le Huitième Jour), starring Daniel Auteuil – (Belgium)
 Element of Doubt, starring Nigel Havers and Gina McKee – (U.K.)
 Emma, starring Gwyneth Paltrow – (UK/US)
 The Emperor's Shadow (Qin Song) – (China)
 The English Patient, directed by Anthony Minghella, starring Ralph Fiennes and Juliette Binoche – (UK/US) – Academy and Golden Globe (drama) Awards for Best Picture
 Entertaining Angels: The Dorothy Day Story, starring Moira Kelly
 Eraser, starring Arnold Schwarzenegger, James Caan, Vanessa Williams
 Escape from L.A., a.k.a. John Carpenter's Escape from L.A., starring Kurt Russell, Steve Buscemi, Stacy Keach, Pam Grier
 The Evening Star, starring Shirley MacLaine, Juliette Lewis, Miranda Richardson, Bill Paxton
 Everyone Says I Love You, directed by and starring Woody Allen, with Edward Norton, Drew Barrymore, Tim Roth, Alan Alda, Goldie Hawn, Julia Roberts
 Evita, directed by Alan Parker, starring Madonna, Antonio Banderas, Jonathan Pryce – Golden Globe for Best Picture (Musical or Comedy)
 Executive Decision, starring Kurt Russell, Steven Seagal, Halle Berry, John Leguizamo, Oliver Platt
 Éxtasis, starring Javier Bardem – (Spain)
 Extreme Measures, starring Gene Hackman and Hugh Grant
 Eye for an Eye, starring Sally Field, Kiefer Sutherland, Ed Harris

F
 Faithful, starring Cher, Chazz Palminteri, Ryan O'Neal
 The Fan, directed by Tony Scott, starring Robert De Niro, Wesley Snipes, Benicio del Toro, Ellen Barkin
 Fargo, written and directed by Joel and Ethan Coen, starring Frances McDormand, William H. Macy, Steve Buscemi - Academy Award winner for Best Original Screenplay and Best Actress
 Fear, starring Mark Wahlberg, Reese Witherspoon, William Petersen, Alyssa Milano, Amy Brenneman
 Feeling Minnesota, starring Keanu Reeves, Cameron Diaz, Vincent D'Onofrio, Dan Aykroyd
 Festival (Chukje) – (South Korea)
 Few of Us (Mūsų nedaug) – (Lithuania)
 Fine Powder (Picado fino) – (Argentina)
 Fire by Deepa Mehta, starring Shabana Azmi and Nandita Das – (Canada/India)
 The First Wives Club, starring Goldie Hawn, Diane Keaton, Bette Midler
 Five Days, Five Nights (Cinco Dias, Cinco Noites) – (Portugal)
 Fled, starring Laurence Fishburne and Stephen Baldwin
 Flipper, starring Elijah Wood and Paul Hogan
 Flirting with Disaster, starring Ben Stiller, Patricia Arquette, Téa Leoni, Alan Alda, Mary Tyler Moore, George Segal, Lily Tomlin
 Floating Life – (Australia)
 Fly Away Home, starring Jeff Daniels, Anna Paquin, Dana Delany
 Follow Me Home, starring Alfre Woodard
 Forbidden City Cop (Dai lap mat tam 008) – (Hong Kong)
 Foreign Land (Terra Estrangeira) – (Brazil/Portugal)
 Foxfire, starring Angelina Jolie
 Freeway, starring Kiefer Sutherland, Reese Witherspoon, Brooke Shields
 The Frighteners, directed by Peter Jackson, starring Michael J. Fox – (United States/New Zealand)
 From Dusk till Dawn, directed by Robert Rodriguez, starring George Clooney, Quentin Tarantino, Harvey Keitel, Juliette Lewis
 The Funeral, directed by Abel Ferrara, starring Christopher Walken, Chris Penn, Annabella Sciorra, Isabella Rossellini

G
 Gabbeh – (Iran)
 Gamera 2: Attack of Legion (Gamera Tsū: Region Shūrai) – (Japan)
 Get on the Bus, directed by Spike Lee
 Ghatak: Lethal, starring Sunny Deol – (India)
 The Ghost and the Darkness, starring Val Kilmer and Michael Douglas
 Ghosts of Mississippi, directed by Rob Reiner, starring Alec Baldwin, Whoopi Goldberg, James Woods
 Girl 6, directed by Spike Lee, starring Theresa Randle, Spike Lee and Isaiah Washington
 The Glimmer Man, starring Steven Seagal and Keenen Ivory Wayans
 Glory Daze, starring Ben Affleck and Alyssa Milano
 The God of Cookery (Shíshén), starring Stephen Chow – (Hong Kong)
 Goodbye South, Goodbye (Nánguó Zaìjiàn, Nánguó) – (Taiwan)
 Gotti, starring Armand Assante and Anthony Quinn
 Grace of My Heart, starring Illeana Douglas, Matt Dillon, Eric Stoltz, John Turturro
 Gray's Anatomy, directed by Steven Soderbergh, starring Spalding Gray
 The Great White Hype, starring Damon Wayans, Jeff Goldblum, Samuel L. Jackson, Peter Berg

H
 Hamlet, directed by and starring Kenneth Branagh with Julie Christie and Derek Jacobi – (UK/US)
 Hamsun, starring Max von Sydow – (Norway/Denmark/Sweden)
 Happy Gilmore, directed by Dennis Dugan, starring Adam Sandler, Christopher McDonald, Julie Bowen, Carl Weathers
 Hard Core Logo – (Canada)
 Hard Eight, directed by P. T. Anderson, starring Philip Baker Hall, John C. Reilly, Samuel L. Jackson, Gwyneth Paltrow
 Harriet The Spy, starring Michelle Trachtenberg and Rosie O'Donnell
 Heaven's Prisoners, directed by Phil Joanou, starring Alec Baldwin, Kelly Lynch, Teri Hatcher, Eric Roberts, Mary Stuart Masterson
 High School High, starring Jon Lovitz
 House Arrest, starring Jamie Lee Curtis, Kevin Pollak, Jennifer Tilly, Jennifer Love Hewitt
 How the War Started on My Island (Kako je počeo rat na mom otoku) – (Croatia)
 The Hunchback of Notre Dame, directed by Gary Trousdale and Kirk Wise, starring Tom Hulce, Demi Moore, Kevin Kline, Tony Jay, Jason Alexander, Charles Kimbrough, Mary Wickes, Paul Kandel, David Ogden Stiers
 The Hunters (Jägarna) – (Sweden)
 Hype!

I
 I Shot Andy Warhol, starring Lili Taylor and Jared Harris
 If Lucy Fell, directed by and starring Eric Schaeffer, with Sarah Jessica Parker and Elle Macpherson
 If These Walls Could Talk, starring Cher, Demi Moore, Sissy Spacek
 I'm Not Rappaport, directed by Herb Gardner, starring Walter Matthau, Ossie Davis, Amy Irving, Martha Plimpton, Craig T. Nelson
 In Love and War, starring Sandra Bullock and Chris O'Donnell
 Independence Day, directed by Roland Emmerich, starring Will Smith, Bill Pullman, Mary McDonnell, Jeff Goldblum
 Indian – (India)
 Infinity, directed by and starring Matthew Broderick, with Patricia Arquette
 Intimate Relations, starring Julie Walters – (Canada/U.K.)
 Irma Vep, starring Maggie Cheung and Jean-Pierre Léaud – (France)
 The Island of Dr. Moreau, starring Marlon Brando and Val Kilmer
 It's My Party, starring Eric Roberts, Gregory Harrison, Margaret Cho, Marlee Matlin, Olivia Newton-John

J
 Jack, directed by Francis Ford Coppola, starring Robin Williams, Diane Lane, Brian Kerwin, Jennifer Lopez, Fran Drescher, Bill Cosby
 James and the Giant Peach, directed by Henry Selick, starring Miriam Margolyes, Joanna Lumley, Pete Postlethwaite and introducing Paul Terry – (UK/US)
 Jane Eyre, directed by Franco Zeffirelli, starring Charlotte Gainsbourg, William Hurt – (Italy/US/UK)
 Jerry Maguire, written and directed by Cameron Crowe, starring Tom Cruise, Cuba Gooding, Jr., Renée Zellweger, Jay Mohr, Jonathan Lipnicki
 Jingle All the Way, starring Arnold Schwarzenegger
 Joe's Apartment, starring Jerry O'Connell and Megan Ward, voices by Billy West, animation directed by Chris Wedge
 Jude, starring Christopher Eccleston and Kate Winslet – (U.K.)
 The Juror, starring Demi Moore, Alec Baldwin, James Gandolfini, Joseph Gordon-Levitt

K
 Kaalapani (Black Water), starring Mohanlal and Tabu – (India)
 Kansas City, directed by Robert Altman, starring Jennifer Jason Leigh, Miranda Richardson, Harry Belafonte, Michael Murphy, Steve Buscemi
 Khamoshi: The Musical (Silence) – (India)
 Kids Return (Kizzu Ritān), directed by Takeshi Kitano – (Japan)
 The King of Masks (Biàn Liǎn) – (China)
 Kingpin, directed by the Farrelly Brothers, starring Woody Harrelson, Randy Quaid, Bill Murray, Vanessa Angel
 Kolya, directed by Jan Svěrák – (Czech Republic) – Academy and Golden Globe Awards for Best Foreign Language Film

L
 Larger than Life, starring Bill Murray
 Last Dance, starring Sharon Stone and Rob Morrow
 The Last Days of Frankie the Fly, starring Dennis Hopper, Kiefer Sutherland, Michael Madsen, Daryl Hannah
 Last Man Standing, directed by Walter Hill, starring Bruce Willis and Christopher Walken
 Leila – (Iran)
 Libertarias (Freedom Fighters) – (Spain)
 Lilies – (Canada)
 Lone Star, directed by John Sayles, starring Matthew McConaughey, Chris Cooper, Joe Morton, Kris Kristofferson
 Long Day's Journey into Night – (Canada)
 The Long Kiss Goodnight, starring Geena Davis and Samuel L. Jackson
 Looking for Richard, directed by and starring Al Pacino
 Lost and Found (Tian ya hai jiao) – (Hong Kong)
 Love Is All There Is, starring Joseph Bologna, Renée Taylor, Lainie Kazan
 Love Serenade, starring Miranda Otto – (Australia)

M
 Mad Dog Time, directed by Larry Bishop, starring Jeff Goldblum, Richard Dreyfuss, Ellen Barkin, Diane Lane, Gabriel Byrne
 Mahjong – (Taiwan)
 The Making of the Mahatma – (India/South Africa)
 Malicious, starring Molly Ringwald
 Manny & Lo, starring Scarlett Johansson
 Mars Attacks!, directed by Tim Burton, starring Jack Nicholson, Annette Bening, Glenn Close, Rod Steiger, Pierce Brosnan, Michael J. Fox, Sarah Jessica Parker
 Marvin's Room, starring Meryl Streep, Diane Keaton, Leonardo DiCaprio, Robert De Niro
 Mary Reilly, directed by Stephen Frears, starring Julia Roberts and John Malkovich
 Matilda, starring Mara Wilson, Danny DeVito, Rhea Perlman, Embeth Davidtz, Pam Ferris
 Maximum Risk, starring Jean-Claude Van Damme and Natasha Henstridge
 Michael, directed by Nora Ephron, starring John Travolta, Andie MacDowell, William Hurt
 Michael Collins, directed by Neil Jordan, starring Liam Neeson, Aidan Quinn, Stephen Rea, Alan Rickman, Julia Roberts – (Ireland/U.K.) – Golden Lion award
 Microcosmos (Microcosmos: Le peuple de l'herbe) – (France/Switzerland/Italy)
 The Mirror Has Two Faces, directed by and starring Barbra Streisand, with Jeff Bridges, Pierce Brosnan, Mimi Rogers, Lauren Bacall
 Mission: Impossible, directed by Brian De Palma, starring Tom Cruise, Kristin Scott Thomas, Ving Rhames, Vanessa Redgrave, Jon Voight, Jean Reno
 Moll Flanders, starring Robin Wright and Morgan Freeman
 Mossane – (Senegal)
 Mother, directed by and starring Albert Brooks, with Debbie Reynolds, Rob Morrow, Lisa Kudrow
 Mother Night, starring Nick Nolte
 Mr. Holland's Opus, starring Richard Dreyfuss, Glenne Headly, Olympia Dukakis, William H. Macy, Jay Thomas
 Mr. Wrong, starring Ellen DeGeneres and Bill Pullman
 Mrs. Winterbourne, starring Ricki Lake, Shirley MacLaine, Brendan Fraser, Loren Dean
 Mulholland Falls, directed by Lee Tamahori, starring Nick Nolte, Melanie Griffith, Jennifer Connelly, Chazz Palminteri, John Malkovich, Treat Williams
 Multiplicity, directed by Harold Ramis, starring Michael Keaton and Andie MacDowell
 Muppet Treasure Island, directed by Brian Henson, starring Tim Curry, Billy Connolly, Jennifer Saunders, Kevin Bishop
 My Fellow Americans, starring Jack Lemmon, James Garner, Dan Aykroyd, Lauren Bacall
 My Man (Mon Homme), directed by Bertrand Blier – (France)
 My Sex Life... or How I Got into an Argument (Comment je me suis disputé...ou Ma vie sexuelle) – (France)
 Mystery Science Theater 3000: The Movie, featuring This Island Earth

N
 Nasser 56, directed by Mohammed Fadel, starring Ahmed Zaki – (Egypt)
 Nénette et Boni – (France)
 Ninne Pelladata – (India)
 North Star, starring James Caan, Christopher Lambert, Catherine McCormack
 The Nutty Professor, directed by Tom Shadyac, starring Eddie Murphy

O
 The Ogre (Der Unhold), directed by Volker Schlöndorff, starring John Malkovich and Armin Mueller-Stahl – (Germany)
 Once Upon a Time in Triad Society (Wong kit cha 'fit' yan) – (Hong Kong)
 One Fine Day, starring Michelle Pfeiffer and George Clooney
 Original Gangstas, starring Jim Brown and Pam Grier
 The Other Side of Sunday (Søndagsengler) – (Norway)

P
 Paradise Lost: The Child Murders at Robin Hood Hills (1996 National Board of Review Best Documentary, 1997 Peabody Award)
 Pedar – (Iran)
 The People vs. Larry Flynt, directed by Miloš Forman, starring Woody Harrelson, Courtney Love, Edward Norton – Golden Bear award (for 1997)
 A Petal (Kkonnip) – (South Korea)
 The Phantom, starring Billy Zane, Treat Williams, Kristy Swanson, Catherine Zeta-Jones, James Remar, Patrick McGoohan – (United States/Australia)
 Phenomenon, starring John Travolta, Kyra Sedgwick, Robert Duvall, Forest Whitaker
 Picnic (Pikunikku) – (Japan)
 Pie in the Sky, starring Josh Charles, Anne Heche, Christine Lahti, John Goodman
 The Pillow Book, directed by Peter Greenaway, starring Vivian Wu, Ewan McGregor, Ken Ogata – (U.K./France/Netherlands)
 Police Story 4: First Strike (Ging chaat goo si 4: Ji gaan daan yam mo), starring Jackie Chan – (Hong Kong)
 Ponette – (France)
 The Portrait of a Lady, directed by Jane Campion, starring Nicole Kidman and John Malkovich
 The Preacher's Wife, directed by Penny Marshall, starring Denzel Washington, Whitney Houston, Courtney B. Vance
 Pretty Village, Pretty Flame (Lepa sela lepo gore) – (Yugoslavia)
 Primal Fear, directed by Gregory Hoblit, starring Richard Gere, Laura Linney, Edward Norton
 Prisoner of the Mountains (Kavkazskiy plennik) – (Russia/Kazakhstan)
 Private Confessions (Enskilda samtal), directed by Liv Ullmann – (Sweden)
 La Promesse (The Promise) – (Belgium)
 Pusher – (Denmark)

Q
 The Quest, starring Jean-Claude Van Damme, Roger Moore
 The Quiet Room – (Australia)

R
 Race the Sun, starring Halle Berry and James Belushi
 Ransom, directed by Ron Howard, starring Mel Gibson, Rene Russo, Gary Sinise, Liev Schreiber, Delroy Lindo
 Revive! Ultraman (Yomigaere! Urutoraman) – (Japan)
 Ridicule, directed by Patrice Leconte, starring Fanny Ardant, Judith Godrèche – (France)
 The Rock, directed by Michael Bay, starring Nicolas Cage, Sean Connery, Ed Harris
 The Rolling Stones Rock and Roll Circus, directed by Michael Lindsay-Hogg – (U.K.)
 Romeo + Juliet, directed by Baz Luhrmann, starring Leonardo DiCaprio and Claire Danes
 Rupan Sansei: Dead or Alive (Rupan Sansei: Deddo oa Araibu) – (Japan)

S
 Sacred Silence (Pianese Nunzio, 14 anni a maggio) – (Italy)
 Saint Clara (Clara Hakedosha) – (Israel)
 A Saturday on Earth (Un samedi sur la terre) – (France)
 Schizopolis, directed by and starring Steven Soderbergh
 Scream, directed by Wes Craven, starring David Arquette, Neve Campbell, Courteney Cox, Drew Barrymore, Rose McGowan, Skeet Ulrich
 Secrets & Lies, directed by Mike Leigh, starring Brenda Blethyn – (U.K.) – Palme d'Or award
 A Self Made Hero (Un héros très discret), directed by Jacques Audiard – (France)
 Set It Off, starring Jada Pinkett Smith, Queen Latifah, Vivica A. Fox, Kimberly Elise
 The Seventh Chronicle (Sedma Kronika) – (Croatia)
 Sgt. Bilko, starring Steve Martin, Dan Aykroyd, Glenne Headly, Phil Hartman
 Shall We Dance? (Shall we Dansu?) – (Japan)
 Shanghai Grand (San Seung Hoi taan), starring Andy Lau and Leslie Cheung – (Hong Kong)
 She's the One, directed by and starring Edward Burns, Jennifer Aniston, Cameron Diaz, Mike McGlone, Maxine Bahns
 Shine, directed by Scott Hicks, starring Geoffrey Rush – (Australia)
 Silent Trigger, starring Dolph Lundgren
 Sleepers, directed by Barry Levinson, starring Brad Pitt, Jason Patric, Kevin Bacon, Minnie Driver, Dustin Hoffman, Robert De Niro
 Sling Blade, directed by and starring Billy Bob Thornton, with Lucas Black, Dwight Yoakam, John Ritter, James Hampton
 A Small Domain
 Small Faces – (U.K.)
 Some Mother's Son, starring Helen Mirren – (Ireland)
 Somersault in a Coffin (Tabutta Rövaşata) – (Turkey)
 Sons (Erzi) – (China)
 Sostiene Pereira, starring Marcello Mastroianni, Joaquim de Almeida, Daniel Auteuil – (Italy/Portugal)
 Space Jam, starring Michael Jordan, Wayne Knight, Theresa Randle, Bill Murray, voices by Danny DeVito
 The Spitfire Grill, starring Marcia Gay Harden, Ellen Burstyn, Alison Elliott
 Spy Hard, starring Leslie Nielsen, Nicollette Sheridan, Barry Bostwick, Andy Griffith
 Star Trek: First Contact, starring Patrick Stewart, Alice Krige, Neal McDonough, Alfre Woodard, James Cromwell
 Stealing Beauty (Io ballo da sola), directed by Bernardo Bertolucci, starring Liv Tyler and Joseph Fiennes – (Italy/U.K./France)
 Striptease, starring Demi Moore, Armand Assante, Ving Rhames, Burt Reynolds
 The Stupids, starring Tom Arnold
 The Substitute, starring Tom Berenger
 A Summer's Tale (Conte d'été), directed by Éric Rohmer – (France)
 Sunchaser, directed by Michael Cimino, starring Woody Harrelson
 Sunset at Chaophraya (a.k.a. Khu Kam) – (Thailand)
 Sunset Park, starring Rhea Perlman
 Supermarket Woman (Sūpā no onna) – (Japan)
 Surviving Picasso, directed by James Ivory, starring Anthony Hopkins and Natascha McElhone
 Swallowtail Butterfly (Suwarōteiru) – (Japan)
 Swingers, directed by Doug Liman, starring Vince Vaughn and Jon Favreau

T
 Taxi, directed by Carlos Saura – (Spain)
 Temptress Moon (Feng yue), directed by Chen Kaige, starring Leslie Cheung and Gong Li – (China/Hong Kong)
 Tender Fictions
 Tesis (Thesis), directed by Alejandro Amenábar – (Spain)
 That Thing You Do!, written and directed by Tom Hanks, starring Tom Everett Scott and Liv Tyler
 Thieves (Les Voleurs), directed by André Téchiné, starring Daniel Auteuil and Catherine Deneuve – (France)
 A Thin Line Between Love and Hate, starring Martin Lawrence and Lynn Whitfield
 Thinner, starring Robert John Burke and Joe Mantegna
 Three Lives and Only One Death (Trois vies et une seule mort), starring Marcello Mastroianni – (France)
 A Time to Kill, starring Sandra Bullock, Matthew McConaughey, Samuel L. Jackson, Ashley Judd, Kiefer Sutherland, Kevin Spacey
 Tin Cup, directed by Ron Shelton, starring Kevin Costner, Rene Russo, Don Johnson, Cheech Marin
 To Gillian on Her 37th Birthday, starring Peter Gallagher, Claire Danes, Kathy Baker, Wendy Crewson, Michelle Pfeiffer
 Too Late (Prea târziu) – (Romania)
 Trainspotting, directed by Danny Boyle, starring Ewan McGregor, Jonny Lee Miller, Robert Carlyle – (U.K.) – Golden space Needle award
 Traveling Companion (Compagna di viaggio) – (Italy)
 Trees Lounge, directed by and starring Steve Buscemi, with Chloë Sevigny, Anthony LaPaglia, Samuel L. Jackson
 Tremors 2: Aftershocks, starring Fred Ward
 The Trigger Effect, starring Kyle MacLachlan and Elisabeth Shue
 Tristar (Da san yuan), directed by Tsui Hark, starring Leslie Cheung – (Hong Kong)
 True Blue – (U.K.)
 The Truth About Cats & Dogs, starring Janeane Garofalo, Uma Thurman, Ben Chaplin
 Twelfth Night: Or What You Will, directed by Trevor Nunn, starring Helena Bonham Carter and Imogen Stubbs – (U.K.)
 Twister, directed by Jan de Bont, starring Helen Hunt, Bill Paxton, Jami Gertz, Cary Elwes
 Two Much, starring Antonio Banderas, Melanie Griffith, Daryl Hannah

U
 Under Western Eyes (Leneged Einayim Ma'araviyot) – (Israel)
 Unforgettable, starring Ray Liotta and Linda Fiorentino
 Unhook the Stars, directed by Nick Cassavetes, starring Gena Rowlands and Marisa Tomei
 Up Close & Personal, directed by Jon Avnet, starring Robert Redford, Michelle Pfeiffer, Kate Nelligan, Stockard Channing, Joe Mantegna
 Urban Safari – (Switzerland)

V
 The Van, directed by Stephen Frears, starring Colm Meaney – (Ireland)
 Village of Dreams (E no naka no boku no mura) – (Japan)
 Viva Erotica (Se qing nan nu) – (Hong Kong)

W
 The War at Home, directed by and starring Emilio Estevez, with Martin Sheen
 The Way to Fight (Kenka no hanamichi) – (Japan)
 When the Cat's Away (Chacun cherche son chat) – (France)
 When We Were Kings, a documentary featuring Muhammad Ali and George Foreman – Academy Award for Best Documentary
 White Squall, directed by Ridley Scott, starring Jeff Bridges
 The Whole Wide World, starring Vincent D'Onofrio and Renée Zellweger
 The Wind in the Willows, directed by Terry Jones, starring Steve Coogan and Eric Idle – (U.K.)
 The Winner, starring Rebecca De Mornay, Vincent D'Onofrio, Michael Madsen, Billy Bob Thornton

Y
 Young and Dangerous (Gu huo zi: Zhi ren zai jiang hu) – (Hong Kong)

Z
 Zarkorr! The Invader

Births
 January 3 - Florence Pugh, English actress
 January 4 - Emma Mackey, English-French actress
 January 5 - Maxim Baldry, English actor
 January 6 - Courtney Eaton, Australian actress
 January 15 - Dove Cameron, American actress
 January 21 - Jorge Lendeborg Jr., Dominican-American actor
 January 25 - Tati Gabrielle, American actress
 January 29 - Bryn Apprill, American voice actress
 February 2 - Paul Mescal, Irish actor
 February 7
David Castro, American actor
Jake Goldberg, American actor
 February 9
Jimmy Bennett, American actor
Kelli Berglund, American actress
 February 16 
 Alex Aiono, American actor
 Nana Komatsu, Japanese actress
 February 17 - Sasha Pieterse, American actress
 February 21 - Sophie Turner, English actress
 February 24 - Mana Kinjo, Japanese actress and model (d. 2020)
 February 28 - Bobb'e J. Thompson, American actor
 March 18
Madeline Carroll, American actress
Eva Noblezada, American actress and singer
 March 21 - Han Ji-hyun, South Korean actress
 March 22 - Jonathan Mason (actor), English actor
 April 14 - Abigail Breslin, American actress
 April 16 - Anya Taylor-Joy, Argentine-English actress
 April 17 - Dee Dee Davis, American actress
 April 28 - Tony Revolori, American actor
 April 29 - Katherine Langford, Australian actress
 May 6 - Dominic Scott Kay, American actor and singer
 May 9
Noah Centineo, American actor
Mary Mouser, American actress
 May 17 - Ryan Ochoa, American actor, rapper, songwriter and producer
 June 1 - Tom Holland, English actor
 June 4 - Maria Bakalova, Bulgarian actress
 June 13 - Kodi Smit-McPhee, Australian actor
 June 20 - Claudia Lee, American actress and singer
 June 24 - Harris Dickinson, English actor
 July 11 - Alessia Cara, Canadian singer-songwriter and actress
 July 16 - Nicky Jones, American actor
 July 17 - Grace Caroline Currey, American actress
 July 22 - Skyler Gisondo, American actor
 July 23 - Rachel G. Fox, American actress
 July 30 - Jacob Lofland, American actor
 August 1 - Cymphonique Miller, American actress and singer
 August 2 - Kansas Bowling, American actress, director, screenwriter and cinematographer
 August 7 - Liam James, Canadian actor
 August 10 - Jacob Latimore, American actor and singer
 August 14 - Brianna Hildebrand, American actress
 August 21 - Jamia Simone Nash, American actress
 September 1 - Zendaya, American actress and singer
 September 3 - Joy (singer), South Korean singer, actress and host
 September 12 - Colin Ford, American actor
 September 13 - Lili Reinhart, American actress
 September 15 - Jake Cherry, American actor
 September 16 - Ryusei Yokohama, Japanese actor
 September 17 - Ella Purnell, English actress
 September 19 - Connor Swindells, English actor and model
 October 4 - Ella Balinska, English actress
 October 5 - Mary Gibbs, American actress
 October 9
Jacob Batalon, American actor
Samuel Honywood, English former teen actor
 October 18 - Nadji Jeter, American actor
 October 25 - Keean Johnson, American actor
 October 27 - Samantha Logan, American actress
 October 28 - Laine MacNeil, Canadian actress
 October 29 - C. J. Wallace (actor), American actor
 November 1 - Daniela Melchior, Portuguese actress
 November 11 - Tye Sheridan, American actor
 November 13 - Otto Farrant, English actor
 November 14 - Mason Gooding, American actor
 November 16 - Mackenyu, Japanese actor
 November 22 - Madison Davenport, American actress and singer
 December 6 - Stefanie Scott, American actress
 December 8 - Teala Dunn, American actress
 December 11
 Jack Griffo, American actor
 Hailee Steinfeld, American actress
 December 12 - Lucas Hedges, American actor
 December 21 - Kaitlyn Dever, American actress
 December 27 - Jae Head, American actor
 December 29 - Dylan Minnette, American actor

Deaths

Film debuts
Wes Anderson (director) - Bottle Rocket
Will Arnett - Close Up
Selma Blair - The Broccoli Theory
Bobby Cannavale - Night Falls on Manhattan
Billy Crudup - Sleepers
Viola Davis - The Substance of Fire
Clea DuVall - Little Witches
Joel Edgerton - Race the Sun
Kimberly Elise - Set It Off
Aunjanue Ellis - Girls Town
Anna Faris - Eden
Joseph Fiennes - Stealing Beauty
Tom Hollander - Some Mother's Son
Nicholas Hoult - Intimate Relations
Rhys Ifans - August
Eddie Izzard - The Secret Agent
Mila Kunis - Santa with Muscles
Kelly Macdonald - Trainspotting
Natascha McElhone - Surviving Picasso
Mads Mikkelsen - Pusher
Radha Mitchell - Love and Other Catastrophes
Gretchen Mol - Girl 6
Tracy Morgan - A Thin Line Between Love and Hate
Emily Mortimer - The Ghost and the Darkness
Edward Norton - Primal Fear
Timothy Olyphant - The First Wives Club
Patton Oswalt - Down Periscope
Jaime Pressly - Mercenary
Freddie Prinze, Jr. - To Gillian on Her 37th Birthday
Missi Pyle - The Cottonwood
Tom Everett Scott - That Thing You Do!
John Slattery - City Hall
Octavia Spencer - A Time to Kill
Julia Stiles - I Love You, I Love You Not
Justin Theroux - I Shot Andy Warhol
Donnie Wahlberg - Bullet
Emily Watson - Breaking the Waves
Michael Kenneth Williams - Bullet
Luke Wilson - Bottle Rocket
Owen Wilson - Bottle Rocket

References

 
Film by year